Pringle Stokes (23 April 1793 – 12 August 1828) was a British naval officer who served in HMS Owen Glendower on a voyage around Cape Horn to the Pacific coast of South America, and on the West African coast fighting the slave trade.
He then commanded HMS Beagle on its first voyage of exploration in the south Atlantic.  After two years in command of the Beagle, depressed by the harsh winter conditions of the Strait of Magellan, he committed suicide.

Early career

Pringle Stokes was born on 23 April 1793, son of Charles and Elizabeth Stokes. He was baptized at Chertsey on 2 May 1793. 
At the age of twelve, on 5 June 1805 he joined the Royal Navy as a midshipman in HMS Ariadne.

Stokes served as a lieutenant on board the frigate HMS Owen Glendower, which left England for South America in November 1819.
Robert FitzRoy, who was to take command of the Beagle after Stokes died, also served on the Owen Glendower on this voyage.  
He had joined the ship as a college volunteer in 1819, aged fourteen. 
The young FitzRoy and Stokes, who was in his late twenties, would have become acquainted on the two-year voyage.
The Owen Glendower visited Saint Helena in October 1820 to report on the conditions in which the former Emperor Napoleon was being held.
Spencer commanded the ship on its journey round Cape Horn to Valparaíso in Chile, arriving in January 1821.
The ship remained in Pacific waters off Chile and Peru until October 1821, when it sailed from Valparaiso, rounded the Horn again in rough weather, and returned to England via Rio de Janeiro, arriving in January 1822.

In November 1822 Captain Sir Robert Mends took command of the Owen Glendower as senior officer on the west coast of Africa, 
charged with suppressing the West African slave trade.
In one incident Stokes was wounded in a clash between the boat crews of the Owen Glendower and the local people of Fernando Po.
On 3 July 1823 he led a party of boats up the New Calabar River, where they found an abandoned schooner that had been loaded with slaves but now only held seven in irons. The schooner was wrecked when the pilot ran it aground two days later.
The Chief of New Calabar River sent the schooner's cargo of 184 slaves out to the Owen Glendower, which took them as far as Cape Coast before landing them.

Sir Robert Mends died at Cape Coast on 4 September 1823. 
Stokes temporarily took command of the ship.
Hearing of the death of Sir Robert Mends, Commander John Filmore, who had recently arrived on the African Station, appointed himself to command the station and transferred to the Owen Glendower.  
Stokes returned to England.
In 1824 Stokes was involved in a dispute over the Spanish slaving schooner Fabiana, which had been captured by the ship's boats under Lieutenant Gray on the Bonny River ten days after Sir Robert Mends died.  The opposing view, which apparently prevailed, was that the ship's boats had been dispatched under the orders of Sir Robert Mends, whose estate would be entitled to the prize money.
In May 1824 Stokes was promoted to commander.

Beagle voyage

The Beagle was built in 1819 in Woolwich.
She was a relatively small ship of 235 tons, barque-rigged.
Pringle Stokes commissioned her around the end of 1825. 
It was said of Stokes when he was appointed to command the Beagle "though he was not practised in professional science, he had been studying in Edinburgh to attain mathematics, and he was moreover an indomitable seaman."
On 22 May 1826 the Beagle left Plymouth along with the larger HMS Adventure under the overall command of Captain Phillip Parker King on a voyage of exploration of the southern coast of South America.
The two ships were to chart the coasts between Montevideo and Chiloé Island, 
with particular attention to the complex of channels and islands around Tierra del Fuego.

The two ships left Montevideo on 19 November 1826, and surveyed the coasts of southern Patagonia and Tierra del Fuego around the Strait of Magellan until April 1827, returning to Rio Janeiro in June 1827.
Pringle Stokes was objective in the way in which he described the Fuegians whom he first met in 1827, unusually for a European of his time. He blamed their primitive condition on the rigors of the climate.
In December that year the two ships sailed south again, this time accompanied by a schooner named Adelaide, and in January 1828 made their base at Port Famine (Puerto del Hambre).  From there, Stokes was directed to "proceed to survey the western coasts, between the Strait of Magalhaens and latitude 47° south, or as much of those dangerous and exposed shores as he could examine".  He was to return to Port Famine by the end of July.

Conditions were extremely difficult.  The narrow rocky channels were uncharted.  There were racing tides, storms and blizzards, and overcast skies or fog that made astronomical observations impossible.
Describing a difficult time in January 1828, a member of the expedition said:

Suicide

After two years of stressful and dangerous work, Stokes became increasingly depressed.
In June 1828 he wrote in his journal:

When the ship returned to Port Famine on 27 July 1828, Stokes had not left his cabin for four weeks.
Lieutenant William Skyring, the assistant surveyor, had in effect taken command.
On 1 August 1828 Stokes shot himself.
The bullet remained within his skull, but Stokes remained conscious and coherent.
Gangrene set in, and Stokes finally died on 12 August 1828.
William Skyring commanded the Beagle on its voyage to Montevideo for repairs. When it arrived there Robert FitzRoy, flag lieutenant of HMS Ganges, was given command.
FitzRoy commanded the Beagle on its celebrated second voyage from 1831 to 1836, with the young naturalist Charles Darwin on board. The observations Darwin made contributed to his subsequent development of his theory of natural selection. Many years later, FitzRoy also suffered from depression, and committed suicide in 1865.

Pringle Stokes was buried at the "English Cemetery", two miles from Port Famine. 
His gravestone is now displayed in the Museo Salesiano in Punta Arenas, about  distant.
Captain Phillip Parker King used Stokes' journal in preparing his official report of the voyage, but glossed over the suicide.
In 2009 the State Library of New South Wales bought the remainder of Stokes' handwritten journal (parts had been eaten by rats) for AU$200,000.

Notes and references
Notes

Citations

Sources

 

1793 births
1828 deaths
People from Surrey
HMS Beagle
Explorers of Chile
Royal Navy officers
1820s suicides
English hydrographers